Ctenodactylinae is a subfamily of beetles in the family Carabidae.

Species 
It contains the following genera:

References

 
Carabidae subfamilies